Christopher Blackett (23 October 1787 – 16 January 1847) was a British politician from Northumberland.

The son of colliery owner Christopher Blackett (1751–1829), his family had lived for centuries at Wylam near Newcastle upon Tyne.

He was a Member of Parliament (MP) for the rotten borough of Bere Alston from 1830 to 1831, and for South Northumberland, 1837–1841.

His eldest son John (1821–1856) was also an MP. His second son Montagu was president of the Oxford Union in 1848 as a student of Christ Church, Oxford.

References

External links 
 

1787 births
1847 deaths
Members of the Parliament of the United Kingdom for Bere Alston
UK MPs 1830–1831
UK MPs 1837–1841
People from Wylam